This is a list of episodes for the Sunrise anime television series The Girl Who Leapt Through Space, often shortened to Sora Kake Girl. The episodes are directed by Masakazu Obara and produced by Sunrise and Bandai Visual. They are based on the original concept by the Sunrise animation staff. The anime began airing in Japan on the TV Tokyo television network on January 5, 2009.

Episode list

References
 General

 
 

 Specific

Girl Who Leapt Through Space, The